Institute of Infrastructure Technology Research and Management (IITRAM) is an autonomous state university located in Maninagar, Ahmedabad, Gujarat, India.

History

IITRAM was established by the Government of Gujarat, through IITRAM Act No. 5, 2013. IITRAM was inaugurated by former Deputy PM of India and Lok Sabha MP from Gandhinagar L. K. Advani.

Academics
IITRAM Ahmedabad offers Bachelor of Technology programs in various fields of Engineering namely Civil Engineering, Electrical Engineering and Mechanical Engineering. 50% Admission to these programs is through taking Academic Council for Professional Courses (ACPC) and rest 50% Admission to these programs is through taking Joint Entrance Examination – Main (JEE – Mains). The institute also offers Masters and PhD studies in various fields in engineering, sciences, humanities, and social sciences. Admissions to these graduate programmes are through written test and/or interviews.

Sum of Rs 12 crore has been allocated to IITRAM to start Department of Advance Defence Technology in collaboration with DRDO.

Campus Life
Institute of Infrastructure, Technology, Research and Management has a lively and vibrant campus life where the students are provided all the amenities for their recreational activities. Since its inception, IITRAM motivates the young minds to develop their over-all personality by participating in activities of different clubs and events held in-house and various acclaimed institutes.

The Open Air Theater serves as a platform for the students to express their creativity by rejuvenating their hidden talents. The campus has a cafeteria that serves healthy and hygienic meals. State-of-art classrooms with audio-visual aids enhance the teaching-learning process. The library houses a good collection of books, journals, CDs, DVDs and also provides online access to world-class journals and periodicals.

IITRAM provides sports facilities, gymnasium and trainer on the field. Fitness of students is always a special call for the institute. Students are encouraged to participate in sports competitions in leading institutes.

The campus is Wi-Fi enabled. Students at IITRAM are engaged in internship programs, research alongside extra-curricular activities to grow as an aspiring engineer with moral and ethical integrity.

References

Engineering colleges in Gujarat
Universities and colleges in Ahmedabad
2013 establishments in Gujarat
Educational institutions established in 2013